Trump administration farmer bailouts are a series of United States bailout programs introduced during the presidency of Donald Trump as a consequence of his "America First" economic policy to help US farmers suffering due to the US-China trade war and trade disputes with European Union, Japan, Canada, Mexico, and others. China and respectively European reconcilable tariffs imposed on peanut butter, soybeans, orange juice, and other agriculture products had hit hard, especially swing states, such as Iowa, Ohio, and Wisconsin.

Introduction
The Donald Trump administration prioritized unilateral trade in the attempts to alleviate the U.S. from unethical trade practices by China. The Trump Administration pushed for strict protectionist policies in the form of raised tariffs and restructuring existing trade deals. The U.S. left NAFTA and the USMCA was created using U.S. protectionist policy. In 2018, the Donald Trump administration introduced an updated set of increased tariffs on foreign goods targeted mainly on China, but later expanding to tariffs on European, Japan, Canadian, and Mexican products as well. In the new economic trade war, US farmers lost access to import markets in China, which represented the second largest market for US agriculture export in 2017,. The Trump Administration initiated the trade war with China when it imposed tariffs on solar cells and large residential washers in 2017. After retaliatory tariffs hit the U.S., the Trump Administration imposed tariffs on steel, aluminum, and auto parts. Retaliatory tariffs by China targeted U.S. agriculture, specifically soybeans, which required the United States government to aid domestic farmers. To improve trade competitiveness, the Trump administration revealed a plan to help US farmers in the form of state aid., with a planned bailout program of $12 billion state aid to US farmers suffering from the US-China trade war. In 2018 Trump administration introduced $16 billion of new trade aid. In 2019, the Donald Trump administration increased the bailout to $16 billion.

Problems
US farmers who earned less than $900,000 a year and produced one of the agriculture products suffering from the US-China trade war, can apply for the state's program. The bailout program had several problems, such as abusing the program and delays in payment to the farmers. Donald Trump stated that US-China trade war could last indefinitely despite problems among US farmers. The bailout's limit of support for a single farmer is $125,000 per person or legal entity. US citizens owning partial shares of a land but not profiting directly from farming could apply for state aid as well. Farmers can apply if they completed the harvest leading to farmers having to wait to complete their crops, making their situation much more uncertain.

In North Dakota, public health officials reported a rising number of suicide caused by unpredictable financial conditions amongst, especially young farmers.

The US government obliged to buy $1.4 billion of products as well and place these products to food banks or programs for schools. Another part of the bailout is a $100 million program to find new markets for US Farmers.

History
In 1979, US President Jimmy Carter issued an embargo on the export of wheat to the Soviet Union as a response to the Soviet–Afghan War. But the embargo did not bring any positive effect to the USA. The Soviet Union eluded the embargo by increasing its domestic wheat production and importing from other countries. The Reagan administration lifted the embargo in 1981, but US farmers suffered financially, leading the US government to introduce bailout programs to the dairy industry. Bailouts helped the dairy industry to increase production however the US government had to buy all oversupply . Later the Reagan administration spent $100 million annually to store and transport all dairy oversupply worth $3 billion from the previous administration.

Domestic Aid 
The United States Department of Agriculture has distributed up to $12 billion in financial aid to agricultural producers most affected by China's retaliatory tariffs. The USDA's aid came in the form of direct cash payments to producers of corn, cotton, soybeans, sorghum, wheat, dairy, and certain meat products. Soybean producers received more payments than any other agricultural producers because of the devastating impact on U.S. soybean exports. Soybean producers received $7.3 billion in payments from the USDA. Since farmers' exports comprise 20% of income, the USDA found it necessary to compensate agricultural producers in response to the decrease in exports.

Bank Sector
Bank sectors serving US farmers reported an increase in late payments. According to the Federal Bank of Minneapolis, the share of bankruptcies had risen by 30%. US farmers' profit decreased by 11% since 2010.

Soybean Sector
US farmers lost access to the critical Chinese market due to US-China trade war. Chinese import of soybean is worth 110 million tons of soybeans in 2017, and it is mainly used to feed animals. Chinese demand for soybean caused massive growth of US soybean production. In the 1990s, soybeans consist of 450,000 acres of land, and by 2017 the amount rose to 6.4 million. Annual export was worth $26 billion annually before 2017.US farmers contributed to funding an organization dedicated to research about the prosperity of US soybeans in China. The export of soybean to Chinafell by 94% in 2017. China increased tariffs on U.S. soybeans to 27%, causing issues as China was the largest importer of American soybeans in 2017. From January to October in 2018, U.S. soybean exports were 63% lower than in the same months of 2017, eventually stopping by November 2018.

Relationships with other countries

China

China had been one of the leading importers of US agricultural products. In 2017 China imported goods worth $19.1 billion, but due to tariffs imposed by China on agriculture products the number of imported goods fell to $9.1 billion. China purchased 14.3 million tonnes of US soybean, which is the lowest number in 11 years. Before US-China trade war, China imported 32.9 million tonnes of US soybean.
An outbreak of African Swine Fever in eastern Asia starting in 2018 led to a lower production of pork products creating substantial import demand, however 62% retaliatory tariffs greatly limited sales from the United States. China, as a member of BRICS, was able to replace US imports with pork imports from other countries, such as Brazil. China-Brazil bilateral trade rose in 2018 to a record $100 billion.

Canada
The Canadian tariffs have been historically limited by quotas, which ensures price stability and farmers' income stability. Canada imposed high tariffs on dairy products. But dairy product trade business between Canada and the USA is just a small fraction of total trade. The entire trade exchange of goods between the USA and Canada is $620 billion, and the dairy sector consists of only $750 million. Donald Trump wanted to renegotiate these terms as part of renegotiating NAFTA agreement, but Canadian farmers are afraid that this new deal will cost them a lot of money.

During negotiating  Trans-Pacific Partnership, New Zealand blocked Canada access due to high tariffs on agriculture products, so Canadian prime minister Stephen Harper decided to scrap the tariffs in exchange for Trans-Pacific Partnership accession. But when the USA withdrew from Trans-Pacific Partnership, Canada withdrew as well.
But Canada has recently signed Comprehensive Economic and Trade Agreement with the European Union, which allows Canadian farmers access without tariffs to the entire European market.

European Union
As part of his "America First" Trump targeted the European Union as well. European Union responded with its list of tariffs, which risked escalating into another trade war, howeverJean-Claude Juncker and Donald Trump agreed to stop escalating.

Japan
With the US-China trade war, renegotiating of NAFTA, and US-European trade relationships, the US looked to Japan for new markets for agriculture products. In 2019 Donald Trump and Shinzo Abe agreed to a trade deal between Japan and the US that would open up markets to an additional $7 billion of products, the deal involved Japan buying excess US corn after Japanese crops were damaged by insect pests.

United Kingdom
Due to Brexit the United Kingdom would no longer have free European trade, possibly to a new market for US food imports. The Trump administration looked to open up trade deals with the UK, however differences in agricultural practices posed challenges to possible deals.

References 

Policies of Donald Trump